Wittsburg is an unincorporated community in Cross County, Arkansas, United States.

Wittsburg was created as a port city as the northernmost navigable point for steamboats on the St. Francis River. Cotton was shipped from the surrounding areas and stored in warehouses at Wittsburg for shipment and sale downstream in the big cotton cities like Memphis, Tennessee or New Orleans, Louisiana. 

When Cross County was created in 1862 during the Civil War, Wittsburg was a thriving commercial and community hub in the region. Wittsburg was designated as the first county seat, but county business was actually conducted in Pineville due to threats from Union forces in the area.

Notable person
 Thomas H. McCray, Confederate Army officer lived here after the war

See also

National Register of Historic Places listings in Cross County, Arkansas
Wittsburg Fortification

References

Unincorporated communities in Cross County, Arkansas
Unincorporated communities in Arkansas